Michail Ivanov Belchev (born 13 August 1946) is a Bulgarian popular singer, songwriter, poet and director.

Biography 
Belchev was born in Sofia, Bulgaria. He received his degree in Mining and Geology at the university in Sofia and Saint Petersburg State Theatre Arts Academy with an emphasis in television direction.

Poetry 
Belchev has published nineteen poems and one poetry collection.

Discography

Albums 
1976 Michail Belchev (producer: Balkanton)
1977 Dvoinik (producer: Balkanton)

References

Bulgarian film directors
20th-century Bulgarian male singers
Bulgarian pop singers
20th-century Bulgarian poets
Bulgarian male poets
1946 births
Living people
Musicians from Sofia